Luka Špoljarić (born 13 September 1995) is a Serbian professional footballer who plays as a midfielder for Greek club Aiolikos.

Career
Špoljarić joined the youth system of Serie A side Genoa in 2014. In 2017, he signed for Santarcangelo in Serie C, where he made eight league appearances. On 27 August 2017, Špoljarić debuted for Santarcangelo in a 1–0 loss to Pordenone.

Career statistics

Club

References

External links
 
 

Living people
1995 births
Sportspeople from Limassol
Serbian footballers
Association football midfielders
Genoa C.F.C. players
Santarcangelo Calcio players
Apollon Pontou FC players
PFC Slavia Sofia players
Aiolikos F.C. players
Serie C players
Football League (Greece) players
First Professional Football League (Bulgaria) players
Serbian expatriate footballers
Serbian expatriate sportspeople in Italy
Serbian expatriate sportspeople in Greece
Serbian expatriate sportspeople in Bulgaria
Expatriate footballers in Italy
Expatriate footballers in Greece
Expatriate footballers in Bulgaria